Deseda is a lake located in Hungary.

References
 Aerial photographs

Deseda